April 27 - Eastern Orthodox liturgical calendar - April 29

All fixed commemorations below celebrated on May 11 by Eastern Orthodox Churches on the Old Calendar.

For April 28th, Orthodox Churches on the Old Calendar commemorate the Saints listed on April 15.

Saints

 Apostles Jason and Sosipater, of the Seventy, and their companions, at Corfu (1st century): (see also April 29 - Greek)
 Martyrs Saturninus, Jakischolus (Inischolus), Faustianus, Januarius, Marsalius, Euphrasius, Mammius -  the holy seven former thieves;
 The virgin Cercyra, and Christodoulos the Ethiopian.
 Martyrs Zeno, Eusebius, Neon, and Vitalis, who were converted by Apostles Jason and Sosipater (c. 63) (see also April 29 - Greek)
 Nine martyrs at Cyzicus (c. 286-299): (see also April 29 - Slavic)
Theognes, Rufus, Antipater, Theostichus, Artemas, Magnus, Theodoulos, Thaumasius, and Philemon
 Martyrs Dada, Maximus, and Quintilian at Dorostolum (286)  (see also: April 13, August 2)
 Martyr Tibald of Pannonia (304)
 Saint Auxibius II, Bishop of Soli, Cyprus (4th century)
 Venerable Memnon the Wonderworker (6th century) (see also April 29 - Slavic)

Pre-Schism Western saints

 Martyrs Aphrodisius, Caralippus, Agapius, and Eusebius (65) (see also May 30 - Greek)
 Saint Mark of Galilee, bishop and martyr (92)
 Saint Artemius (Arthemius), Bishop of Sens (609)
 Saint Gerard the Pilgrim (c. 639)
 Venerable Crónán, abbot of Roscrea, Ireland (640)
 Saint Pamphilus, Bishop of Sulmona and Corfinium (c. 700)
 Saint Prudentius, Bishop of Tarazona in Aragon (c. 700)
 Saint Adalbero, Bishop of Augsburg (909)

Post-Schism Orthodox saints

 Saint Cyril of Turov, Bishop (1183)
 Saint Cyril, founder of Syrinsk Monastery, Karelia (1402)
 Venerable Cyriacus, abbot of Kargopol, Vologda (1462)

New martyrs and confessors

 Virgin-martyr Anna Shashkina, new martyr of Yaroslavl-Rostov (1940)

Other commemorations

 The Miracle at Carthage (c. 610-641)
 Repose of Archimandrite Hilarion (Argatu) of Cernica (1999)
 Repose of Hieroschemamonk Dionysius (Ignat) of Kolitsou Skete, Mt. Athos (2004)

Icon gallery

Notes

References

Sources
 April 28/May 11. Orthodox Calendar (Pravoslavie.ru).
 May 11 / April 28. Holy Trinity Russian Orthodox Church (A parish of the Patriarchate of Moscow).
 April 28. Latin Saints of the Orthodox Patriarchate of Rome.
 The Roman Martyrology. Transl. by the Archbishop of Baltimore. Last Edition, According to the Copy Printed at Rome in 1914. Revised Edition, with the Imprimatur of His Eminence Cardinal Gibbons. Baltimore: John Murphy Company, 1916. pp. 119–120.
 Rev. Richard Stanton. A Menology of England and Wales, or, Brief Memorials of the Ancient British and English Saints Arranged According to the Calendar, Together with the Martyrs of the 16th and 17th Centuries. London: Burns & Oates, 1892. pp. 184–185.
Greek Sources
 Great Synaxaristes:  28 Απριλίου. Μέγας Συναξαριστής.
  Συναξαριστής. 28 Απριλίου. Ecclesia.gr. (H Εκκλησία της Ελλάδος).
Russian Sources
  11 мая (28 апреля). Православная Энциклопедия под редакцией Патриарха Московского и всея Руси Кирилла (электронная версия). (Orthodox Encyclopedia - Pravenc.ru).
  28 апреля (ст.ст.) 11 мая 2013 (нов. ст.) . Русская Православная Церковь Отдел внешних церковных связей. (DECR).

April in the Eastern Orthodox calendar